Events from the year 1294 in Ireland.

Incumbent
Lord: Edward I

Events
 Adam de Wodington appointed Lord Chancellor of Ireland

Deaths
 October 2 – John de Sandford, Archbishop of Dublin.

References